Hooshang Samadi Kalkhurani is a retired military officer and war hero with the rank of captain who served in the Iranian Navy during Iran–Iraq War.

Samadi was commander of the 1st Marine Battalion, a naval special unit that played a key role in the Battle of Khorramshahr and Liberation of Khorramshahr under his command.

References

Living people
1940 births
Iranian Takavar Marines
Islamic Republic of Iran Army personnel of the Iran–Iraq War
People from Ardabil